The rosters of all participating teams at the men's tournament of the 2018 Rugby World Cup Sevens.

Argentina 

Head coach: Santiago Gómez Cora

Australia 

Head coach: Tim Walsh

Canada 

Head Coach:  Damian McGrath

Chile 

Head coach: Edmundo Olfos

England 

Head coach: Simon Amor

Fiji 

Head coach:  Gareth Baber

France 

Head coach: Jérôme Daret

Hong Kong 

Head coach:  Paul John

Ireland 

Head coach: Stan McDowell

Jamaica 

Head coach: Huntley Anderson

Japan 

Head coach: Kensuke Iwabuchi

Kenya 

Head coach: Innocent Simiyu

New Zealand 

Head coach: Clark Laidlaw

Papua New Guinea 

Head coach: Douglas Guise

Russia 

Head coach: Andrey Sorokin

Samoa 

Head coach:  Gordon Tietjens

Scotland 

Head Coach: John Dalziel

South Africa 

Head Coach: Neil Powell

Tonga 

Head coach: Taholo Anitoni

Uganda 

Head coach:  Tolbert Onyango

United States 

Head coach:  Mike Friday

Uruguay 

Head coach: Luis Pedro Achard

Wales 

Head coach: Gareth Williams

Zimbabwe 

Head coach: Gilbert Nyamutsamba

References 

Rugby World Cup Sevens squads
Squads